USS Guerriere was the first frigate built in the United States since 1801. This victory was one of the United States' first in the War of 1812.

She was built at the Philadelphia Navy Yard under the supervision of Joseph and Francis Grice.  She was launched on 20 June 1814 under the command of Commodore John Rodgers and attached to the Delaware Flotilla. She served in the United States Navy during the Second Barbary War.

Second Barbary War operations
After fitting out, she was transferred to the command of Captain Stephen Decatur and became the flagship of the squadron assembled at New York. She sailed from New York on 20 May 1815 to lead the squadron in terminating piratical acts against American merchant commerce by Algiers and other Barbary States.

On 17 June 1815, off the Algerian coast, the frigate  drove the 44-gun frigate Meshuda, the flagship of the Algerian Fleet, under the guns of Decatur's flagship, Guerriere. With two broadsides, the American frigate drove below all who were not killed or disabled on Meshudas decks, where after, Meshuda surrendered. Among her fatalities was Rais Hamidu, Algiers' ranking naval officer. Two days later, Guerriere led the squadron in driving the 22-gun Algerian brig Estedio ashore.

On board Guerriere during the battle was Lieutenant James Monroe of the U.S. Army, who was a nephew of President James Monroe.  Lieutenant Monroe was wounded during the battle and would later serve in Congress.

Guerriere arrived at Algiers on 28 June 1815, ready to act with her squadron for the capture of every Algerian ship that entered port unless the Dey ratified the terms of a peace treaty sent him by Decatur. The treaty was negotiated on board Guerriere on 30 June 1815, ending the payment of tribute to Algiers and exacting full payment for injuries to American commerce.

Guerriere next led the squadron in a show of force that resulted in a peace settlement with Tunis on 13 July 1815 and with Tripoli on 9 August 1815.

Having enforced the peace in less than six weeks from time of sailing from the United States, she combined with the entire Mediterranean Squadron naval force assembled at Gibraltar under Commodore William Bainbridge. The 18 warships, including ship-of-the-line , five frigates, two sloops-of-war, seven brigs, and three schooners, was the largest fleet ever collected under the American flag in the Mediterranean Sea to that time. It marked the beginning of a permanent naval fleet in the Mediterranean, which has evolved into the powerful 6th Fleet of today. Then, as today, the fleet was a factor in keeping the peace and strengthening the international diplomacy of the nation.

Peacetime operations
Guerriere returned to New York on 12 November 1815 and was laid up in the Boston Navy Yard for repairs on 4 March 1816. She recommissioned under Captain Thomas Macdonough on 22 April 1818 for fitting out. On 24 July 1818 she put to sea, carrying the American Minister to Russia to his new post. After calls at Gibraltar, Cowes and Copenhagen, she disembarked the American Minister and his family at Kronstadt, Russia, on 17 September 1818. She then cruised throughout the Mediterranean until 26 July 1819 when she departed Leghorn for Norfolk, Virginia, arriving 4 October 1819. She remained and was placed in ordinary there on 8 November 1820. For the next seven years she served as a schoolship in the Norfolk Navy Yard, training classes of midshipmen before the permanent establishment of a naval academy.

Guerriere terminated her schoolship duties late in November 1828 when she was ordered to fit out as the flagship of a U.S. Navy squadron destined for duty in the Pacific. She sailed on 13 February 1829, landing passengers at Rio de Janeiro before rounding Cape Horn for Callao, Peru. In the following two years, she watched over American commerce, including the whaling fleet, along the western seaboard of South America and westward to the Hawaiian Islands. She departed Callao 8 September 1831 and arrived in Norfolk 29 November 1831. Guerriere was decommissioned on 19 December 1831, and remained in ordinary at the Norfolk Navy Yard until broken up in 1841.

Bibliography

References

Sailing frigates of the United States Navy
Barbary Wars American ships
Ships built in Philadelphia
1814 ships